The Lester Hotel building is an historic structure located at 417 Market Street in the Gaslamp Quarter, San Diego, in the U.S. state of California. It was built in 1905.

See also
 List of Gaslamp Quarter historic buildings

External links

 

1905 establishments in California
Buildings and structures in San Diego
Gaslamp Quarter, San Diego
Hotel buildings completed in 1905
Hotels in San Diego